Rua 5 de Julho (also: Rua Pedonal "pedestrian street", formerly Rua D. Luís) is a street in the Plateau, the historic centre of Praia, Santiago island, Cape Verde. Formerly named Rua D. Luís after King Luís I of Portugal, it was renamed after 5 July, the independence day of Cape Verde (1975). It runs south to north, parallel to Avenida Amílcar Cabral and Rua Serpa Pinto. Praça Alexandre Albuquerque is at its southern end. It has been pedestrianised in the early 21st century.
 

Notable buildings along the street:
the Municipal Market
Museu Etnográfico da Praia

References

Plateau of Praia
Streets in Praia